The 1949 Auburn Tigers football team represented Auburn University in the 1949 college football season. It was the Tigers' 58th overall and 17th season as a member of the Southeastern Conference (SEC). The team was led by head coach Earl Brown, in his second year, and played their home games at Cliff Hare Stadium in Auburn, the Cramton Bowl in Montgomery and Ladd Memorial Stadium in Mobile, Alabama. They finished the season with a record of two wins, four losses and three ties (2–4–3 overall, 2–4–2 in the SEC).

Schedule

References

Auburn
Auburn Tigers football seasons
Auburn Tigers football